The Office of Space Commerce is an office within the United States Department of Commerce. It is currently one of several offices within the department that are responsible for overseeing and promoting economic activity in space. The office is small in size, and its first director was Kevin O'Connell. In January 2021, Mark Paese took over as acting director.

In May 2018, Wilbur Ross, the Secretary of Commerce announced plans to consolidate the Office with the Commercial Remote Sensing Regulatory Affairs Office to form a new administration, the Space Policy Advancing Commercial Enterprise (SPACE) Administration. The goal of the new agency would be to streamline the regulatory process. These plans were subsequently abandoned.

References 

United States Department of Commerce